Nohanent is commune in the Puy-de-Dôme department in Auvergne-Rhône-Alpes in central France.

Population

See also 
 Communes of the Puy-de-Dôme department

References

External links 

 Official Website (in French)

Communes of Puy-de-Dôme